Alt-Treptow (literally Old Treptow) is a German locality in the borough of Treptow-Köpenick in Berlin. Known also as Treptow it was, until 2001, the main and the eponymous locality of the former Treptow borough.

History
The locality, first inhabited in 6th century by Slavic peoples, was first mentioned in 1568 with the name of Trebow. It merged into Berlin with the Greater Berlin Act in 1920. From 1961 to 1989 its north and western borders were crossed by the Berlin Wall. From January 1, 2001 the former borough of Treptow, composed also by Plänterwald, Baumschulenweg, Niederschöneweide, Johannisthal, Adlershof, Altglienicke and Bohnsdorf; was disestablished to merge into the new Treptow-Köpenick borough.

Geography
Alt-Treptow is situated in the south-eastern suburb of Berlin and half of its territory is occupied by the Treptower Park. It borders with the localities of Plänterwald, Neukölln (in Neukölln borough), Friedrichshain and Kreuzberg (in Friedrichshain-Kreuzberg borough). Bordered in north by the Spree river it counts in its territory an islet named "Insel der Jugend" (Youth Island).

Transport
The locality is served by the S-Bahn at Berlin Treptower Park station, on the lines S4, S8, S85, and S9.

See also
 Badeschiff
 Molecule Man
 Osthafen
 Soviet War Memorial (Treptower Park)
 Spreepark
 Treptowers
 Treptower Park

References

Photogallery

External links

  Alt-Treptow page on www.berlin.de

Localities of Berlin

Populated places established in the 6th century